United States Space Force rank insignia are used to indicate the rank and status of the United States Space Force officers and enlisted personnel. Equivalency between the military services is indicated by associated NATO code and pay grade.

Insignia

Officer insignia

Enlisted insignia

Rank insignia wear

On the service dress uniform metal rank is worn on the shoulder straps. On the OCP uniform, the Space Force's combat utility uniform, embroidered navy blue rank is worn on an OCP patch on the center of the chest.

History
The creation of the Space Force marked the first time since the 1947 creation of the Air Force that a new branch was created. This created an interest in the rank structure and insignia. In February 2020, it was announced that the Space Force would ask military space professionals for opinions on ranks.

Eighty-six graduates of the United States Air Force Academy class of 2020 commissioned directly into the USSF, becoming the service's first new officers and second lieutenants. On July 28, 2020, four general officers from the Air Force were nominated to transfer to the Space Force in their current grade of major general, and then be promoted to lieutenant general. On August 6, 2020, a number of Air Force officers were transferred to the Space Force in the ranks of major, lieutenant colonel and colonel.  On September 1, 2020, the Air Force transferred 2410 active-duty airmen to the Space Force to become enlisted space professionals. The space professionals were all transferred to the Space Force in their current enlisted ranks.

The Space Force was set to announce its new rank structure in late August 2020 but decided to delay it temporarily, as a proposed amendment included in the United States House of Representatives's version of the 2021 National Defense Authorization Act would require the Space Force to adopt a rank structure based on that of the United States Navy for its officers and enlisted space professionals. The Space Force decided to wait until after the 2021 NDAA was passed, before moving forward with their permanent rank structure. While awaiting the passage of the NDAA, all members of the Space Force retained their respective grade and rank carried over from the Air Force. On November 16, 2020, the United States Senate passed the House of Representatives' version of the NDAA, but attached an amendment which would remove the clause requiring the Space Force to adopt naval ranks, and sent it back to the House for consideration. The House unanimously disagreed with the Senate's amendment and sent the amended bill back to their armed services committee on November 18, for consideration of passage. The final version of the NDAA removed any requirement for the Space Force to adopt naval ranks. The official rank structure became effective on 1 February 2021, which includes the rank of specialist being used for paygrades E-1 to E-4 for the first time since the Army discontinued its use of multiple specialist ranks in 1985. The rank of 'Sergeant' replaces 'Staff Sergeant' as used by the Air Force in the pay grade of E-5.

On 20 September 2021, Chief Master Sergeant of the Space Force, Roger A. Towberman, announced the selected insignia.

In May 2022, changes to the interim officer uniform were introduced. Buttons were changed from the Hap Arnold star and wings to the Space Force Delta.

Enlisted rank insignia development
On 2 March 2021, the Space Force released a survey for guardians to give feedback on four sets of enlisted rank insignia. One version of the proposed enlisted rank insignia mirrored the current Air Force design, but with the Air Corps star replaced by the Delta, Globe, and Orbit. Another version resembled Army and Marine Corps enlisted insignia, but with the Delta, Globe, and Orbit at the bottom of the design. A third inverted the Army/Marine Corps' styled chevrons. A fourth option resembled Navy and Coast Guard rank insignia.

Timeline of changes

See also
 Uniforms of the United States Space Force
 Ranks and insignia of space forces

References

Military ranks of the United States Space Force